Kandha Kadamba Kathir Vela is a 2000 Indian Tamil-language romantic comedy film directed by Rama Narayanan. The film is loosely based on Poova Thalaiya (1969). The film was remade in Kannada as Namma Samsara Ananda Sagara (2001).

Plot 
Parvathi is a rich and arrogant woman who leads her life with her three sons – Kandha, Kadamba and Kathirvela. The sons are very obedient towards their mother and they run a restaurant in Chennai. Parvathi also had a daughter named Mallika who is married to Vadivelan, a barber following which Parvathi disowns her daughter. Vadivelan decides to teach a lesson for Parvathi. He understands that Parvathi's sons are in love with girls from an economically backward community and sets a plan to get them married against Parvathi's wishes. Kandha is married to Rupini, Kadamba to Rohini and Kathir to Ragini.

Parvathi has originally planned to get her sons married to a rich family from London with a hope of getting hefty dowry and she hates her daughters in law as they are poor. Also, her sons support their wives which angers her further. Parvathi sets a plan to separate her sons from their wives by staging a drama. She pretends to be affectionate towards her daughters in law and persuades them to stay away from their husbands. She also brings a new maid to their home and creates a fear in the minds of her daughters in law about their husbands having an illegitimate affair with the new maid.

Parvathi succeeds in her plan and her daughters-in-law leave her home following a misunderstanding with her sons. Now, she plans to convince her sons to divorce their wives and make them marry her choice. But the maid (appointed by Parvathi) threatens her and demands a sum of Rs. 5 crores for not revealing the truth. Parvathi is kidnapped by the maid and her men. But her sons along with their wives come and save Parvathi following which she understands the real nature of her daughters-in-law and accepts them. She also accepts her daughter and Vadivelan.

Cast

Soundtrack 
The soundtrack was composed by S. A. Rajkumar with lyrics written by Viveka and Kalidasan.

References

External links 
 

2000 films
2000s Tamil-language films
Films directed by Rama Narayanan
Indian comedy films
Films scored by S. A. Rajkumar
Tamil films remade in other languages